Sir Matthew Gough (died 5 July 1450) was a Welsh soldier that served in the Hundred Years' War.

Biography
Gough was a son of Owen Gough and Hawys Hanmer.

He is known to have taken part in the battles of Cravant (1423) and Verneuil (1424). He was subsequently in command of various towns and fortresses, including Laval, Saint Denis, Le Mans, Bellême, and Bayeux. In 1432 he was taken prisoner at Saint Denis.

Matthew as Captain of Bayeux, reinforced an English army in Normandy, under the command of Thomas Kyriell in 1450. A French army under the command of Jean de Bourbon, together with a force of Breton cavalry, under Arthur de Richemont, defeated the English army at the Battle of Formigny,  with the remnants of Gough's force able to flee the battlefield.

Returning to England, Gough was placed in joint command of the Tower of London. Whilst defending the city against Jack Cade's rebels, he was killed upon London Bridge on 5 July 1450. He was buried in the choir of St. Mary's of the Carmelite Friars in London.

Marriage and issue
He married Margaret, daughter of Rhys Moythe and Margaret Harley, they are known to have had the following known issue:
 Geoffrey Gough
 Mathew Gough
 David Gough
 Margaret Gough

Citations

References
Evans, H. T., (1959). GOUGH (GOCH), MATHEW (MATHAU) (c. 1390 - died 1450), soldier. Dictionary of Welsh Biography.

Year of birth unknown
1450 deaths
15th-century Welsh military personnel
Welsh knights